The stannite ion is , or similar. Stannite ion can be formed by adding strong base to stannous hydroxide. Stannite ion is a strong reducing agent; also, it may disproportionate to tin metal plus stannate ion.

There are stannite compounds, for example, sodium stannite, .

See also
 Stannate

Oxyanions